Space Race is the second studio album by New Zealand New Wave music group Mi-Sex, released in May 1980.The album peaked at number one on the New Zealand albums chart and was certified platinum.

The record label launched a promotional campaign with the slogan 'Are you a clone? . . . No, I'm in the Space Race'. Little rubber alien mannequins as featured on the front cover popped up all over the place." Ed Nimmervoll of Howlspace website felt that the album was "talking about overpopulation, environmental issues, genetic engineering and other issues of great importance for the future."

Track listing

Charts

Weekly charts

Year-end charts

Certifications

References

Mi-Sex albums
CBS Records albums
1980 albums